Os Grandes Portugueses was a public poll contest organized by the Portuguese public broadcasting station RTP and hosted by Maria Elisa. Based on BBC's 100 Greatest Britons, it featured individual documentaries advocating the top ten candidates. The final vote took place on 25 March 2007, the winner being António de Oliveira Salazar, Portugal's Prime Minister from 1932 to 1968.

Format
The series started in October 2006, with each episode featuring small groups of candidates considered amongst the Greatest Portuguese. Based on voting results, the list of 10 most voted-for personalities were revealed on 14 January 2007, in alphabetical order. All of the 10 finalists were deceased. The ten finalists were then featured in individual documentary episodes, followed by a second round of voting within these top ten. On 25 March the voting results for the final 10, and the full list of 100, was announced.

Summary of results
There are 19 women in the final list of the top 100 Greatest Portuguese, with singer and actress Amália Rodrigues rating the highest, at number 14. The list included 33 then-living persons, with former president and prime minister Mário Soares rating the highest, at number 12. A total of 66 on the list (including the 33 then-living) are predominantly 20th century figures. Of the 100 candidates presented in the opening programs, the only (likely) fictional person was Brites de Almeida, a baker who legend says killed six Castilian soldiers during the 1335 Battle of Aljubarrota, a battle in which Portuguese independence was confirmed; she appeared at number 51 when the final list was released.

The Top-10
Prime Minister António de Oliveira Salazar, whose episode was presented by Jaime Nogueira Pinto, polled the most (41%); his lifelong communist political opponent Álvaro Cunhal was second (19%), and the diplomat Aristides de Sousa Mendes third (13%).

A simultaneous opinion poll conducted by Marktest showed that, given the choice of the finalists, Salazar was the favourite of only 11%. RTP itself commissioned a simultaneous poll, conducted by Eurosondagem, which ranked Salazar 7th, with 6.6% of the vote, and Afonso I 1st with 21%. The difference of these statistically conducted polls to the final result of the Os Grandes Portugueses program suggest that the voting for the program, consisting of voluntary telephone calls, may have been skewed by repeat voters in general or organized groups of repeat voters with vested interests.

The other 90

Os Piores Portugueses
The SIC Notícias programme Eixo do Mal (Axis of Evil) held a parallel vote for Os Piores Portugueses (The Worst Portuguese), also won by António de Oliveira Salazar.

Other editions

Other countries have produced similar shows; see Greatest Britons spin-offs

References

Greatest Nationals
Rádio e Televisão de Portugal original programming
Lists of Portuguese people
2006 Portuguese television series debuts
2007 Portuguese television series endings
Portuguese television series based on British television series